Rushall is a village and former civil parish, now in the parish of Dickleburgh and Rushall, in the South Norfolk district, in the county of Norfolk, England. In 1931 the parish had a population of 176.

The church of Rushall St Mary the Virgin is one of 124 existing round-tower churches in Norfolk.

Toponymy 
The name 'Rushall' means perhaps, 'Rif's nook of land' or the first element may be Old English 'hrif', 'belly/womb', used in some topographical sense.

History
The village used to be its own civil parish until it merged with Dickleburgh on 1 April 1935, the parish is now called Dickleburgh and Rushall.

References 

Villages in Norfolk
Former civil parishes in Norfolk
South Norfolk